The 2010 Calderdale Metropolitan Borough Council election took place on 6 May 2010 to elect members of Calderdale Metropolitan Borough Council in England. This was on the same day as other local elections and a general election. One councillor was elected in each ward for a four-year term so the councillors elected in 2010 last stood for election in 2006. Each ward is represented by three councillors, the election of which is staggered, so only one third of the councillors was elected in this election. After the election the council stayed in no overall control but the Conservative minority administration was replaced with a coalition between Labour and the Liberal Democrats.

Brighouse Councillor Joyce Cawthra left the Conservative Party and became an Independent in December 2010 due to her not being selected by the party to stand in the next election.

Council result

Council Composition
Prior to the election the composition of the council was:

After the election the composition of the council was:

Ward results

Brighouse ward

The incumbent was Colin Stout as an Independent.

Calder ward

The incumbent was Nader Fekri for the Liberal Democrats.

Elland ward

The incumbent was Robert Thompson for the Liberal Democrats who stood down at this election.

Greetland and Stainland ward

The incumbent was Conrad Winterbottom for the Liberal Democrats.

Hipperholme and Lightcliffe ward

The incumbent was Colin Raistrick as an Independent.

Illingworth and Mixenden ward

The incumbent was Geoffrey Wallace for the BNP who stood down at this election.

Luddendenfoot ward

The incumbent was Peter Coles for the Liberal Democrats who stood down at this election.

Northowram and Shelf ward

The incumbent was Stephen Baines for the Conservative Party.

Ovenden ward

The incumbent was Helen Rivron for the Labour Party.

Park ward

The incumbent was Zafar Iqbal-Din for the Labour Party who stood down at this election.

Rastrick ward

The incumbent was Paul Rogan for the English Democrats who stood down at this election. He had been elected as a Conservative.

Ryburn ward

The incumbent was Kay Barret for the Conservative Party.

Skircoat ward

The incumbent was Grenville Horsfall for the Conservative Party who stood down at this election.

Sowerby Bridge ward

The incumbent was Martin Peel for the Conservative Party.

Todmorden ward

The incumbent was Ruth Goldthorpe for the Liberal Democrats.

Town ward

The incumbent was Bob Metcalfe for the Labour Party.

Warley ward

The incumbent was David Ginley for the Conservative Party.

References

2010 English local elections
May 2010 events in the United Kingdom
2010
2010s in West Yorkshire